Harsh Shailesh Patre (born 25 January 2003) is an Indian professional footballer who plays as a central midfielder for Bengaluru B.

Career

Harsh Patre made his first professional appearance for Indian Arrows on 10 January 2021 against Churchill Brothers.

Career statistics

Club

Honours
India U20
SAFF U-20 Championship: 2022

References

2003 births
Living people
Indian footballers
India youth international footballers
Association football midfielders
Indian Arrows players
I-League players
Footballers from Goa